Mutum is a 2007 Brazilian film directed by Sandra Kogut. The script, developed by Kogut and Ana Luísa Martins Costa, is based on Guimarães Rosa's novella . The story takes place on an isolated farm in Mutum, in the sertão of Minas Gerais.

Cast 

 Thiago da Silva Mariz - Thiago
 Wallison Felipe Leal Barroso - Felipe
 João Miguel - Father
 Izadora Fernandes - Mother
 Rômulo Braga - Uncle Terez
 Paula Regina Sampaio da Silva - Rosa
 Maria das Graças Leal Macedo - Grandma Izidra
 Eduardo Moreira - Man from the city

With the exception of João Miguel, Izadora Fernandes, Rômulo Braga and Eduardo Moreira, the cast is composed of non-professional actors chosen by the director and scriptwriter from inhabitants of the sertão of Minas Gerais, where filming took place.

References 

Brazilian drama films
Films based on books
Culture in Minas Gerais
2007 films